Jordan is a country in the Middle East.

Jordan or Jordán may also refer to:

People
 Jordan (name), a list of people with this given name or surname
 Michael Jordan, former NBA Player
 Jordan (footballer, born 1932), Jordan da Costa, Brazilian football defender
 Jordan (footballer, born 1999), Anderson Jordan da Silva Cordeiro, Brazilian football centre-back
 Katie Price (born 1978), British glamour model known as Jordan
 Pamela Rooke, English model and actress also known as Jordan

Businesses
 Jordan (dental company), Norwegian manufacturer of toothbrushes and cleaning supplies
 Jordan Grand Prix, an Irish Formula One constructor 
 Jordan Motor Car Company, an automobile manufacturer of the 1920s
 Air Jordan, a nickname for Michael Jordan and the brand name of his athletic wear

Music
 "Jordan" (Buckethead composition)
 "Jordan", a 2006 song by Bellowhead from Burlesque
 "Jordan", a hymn tune by William Billings
 "Jordan", a 1998 song by Megaherz from Kopfschuss

Places

United States  
 Jordan, Daviess County, Indiana, an unincorporated community
 Jordan, Owen County, Indiana, an unincorporated community
 Jordan, Iowa, an unincorporated community
 Jordan, Kentucky, an unincorporated community
 Jordan, Minnesota, a city
 Jordan, Minneapolis, a neighborhood of Minneapolis, Minnesota
 Jordan, Missouri, an unincorporated community
 Jordan, Montana, a town
 Jordan, New York, a village
 Jordan, North Carolina, an unincorporated community
 Jordan, Oregon, an unincorporated community
 Jordan, Wisconsin, a town
 Jordan, Portage County, Wisconsin, an unincorporated community
 Jordan Township (disambiguation)
 Jordan River (disambiguation), various rivers in the United States and elsewhere
 Jordan Creek (disambiguation)

Elsewhere
 Jordan River (disambiguation) 
 Jordan River, a river in the Middle East that flows through the Sea of Galilee and on to the Dead Sea
 Jordan Valley, in the West Bank of Palestine
 Jordan, Ontario, Canada, a community
 Jordán Pond, Tábor, Czech Republic
 Jordan, Hong Kong, an area
 Nelson Mandela Boulevard (Jordan Street) Tehran, Iran, a district and street
 Jordan, Guimaras, Philippines, a 3rd class municipality
 Jordan (Neumark), Poland, a village

Other uses
 Jordan College (disambiguation)
 Chamber pot or Jordan
 R v Jordan (2016), informally "Jordan", a court case in Canada that established constitutional time limits to prosecuting a criminal case

See also 
 JRDN (born 1978), Canadian musician
 Giordano (surname)
 Jordaan, a district of the city of Amsterdam in The Netherlands
 Jordans (disambiguation)
 Jordanus (disambiguation)
 Jourdain (disambiguation)